Phonetic transcription (also known as phonetic script or phonetic notation) is the visual representation of speech sounds (or phones) by means of symbols. The most common type of phonetic transcription uses a phonetic alphabet, such as the International Phonetic Alphabet.

Versus orthography
The pronunciation of words in all languages changes over time. However, their written forms (orthography) are often not modified to take account of such changes, and do not accurately represent the pronunciation.  Words borrowed from other languages may retain the spelling from the original language, which may have a different system of correspondences between written symbols and speech sounds. Pronunciation can also vary greatly among dialects of a language. Standard orthography in some languages, such as English and Tibetan, is often irregular and makes it difficult to predict pronunciation from spelling. For example, the words bough, chough, cough, though and through do not rhyme in English even though their spellings might suggest otherwise. Other languages, such as Spanish and Italian have a more consistent (but still imperfect) relationship between orthography and pronunciation, while a few languages may claim to have a fully phonemic spelling system (a phonemic orthography).

For most languages, phonetic transcription makes it possible to show pronunciation with something much nearer to a one-to-one relationship between sound and symbol than is possible with the language's orthography. Phonetic transcription allows one to step outside orthography, examine differences in pronunciation between dialects within a given language and identify changes in pronunciation that may take place over time.

A basic principle of phonetic transcription is that it should be applicable to all languages, and its symbols should denote the same phonetic properties whatever the language being transcribed. It follows that a transcription devised for one individual language or group of languages is not a phonetic transcription but an orthography.

Narrow versus broad transcription
Phonetic transcription may be used to transcribe the phones of a language. In all systems of transcription there is a distinction between broad transcription and narrow transcription. Broad transcription indicates only the most noticeable phonetic features of an utterance, whereas narrow transcription encodes more information about the phonetic characteristics of the allophones in the utterance. The difference between broad and narrow is a continuum, but the difference between phonemic and phonetic transcription is usually treated as a binary distinction. Phonemic transcription is a particular form of broad transcription which disregards all allophonic difference; as the name implies, it is not really a phonetic transcription at all (though at times it may coincide with one), but a representation of phonemic structure. A transcription which includes some allophonic detail but is closely linked to the phonemic structure of an utterance is called an allophonic transcription.

The advantage of the narrow transcription is that it can help learners to produce exactly the right sound and allows linguists to make detailed analyses of language variation. The disadvantage is that a narrow transcription is rarely representative of all speakers of a language.

A further disadvantage of narrow transcription is that it involves a larger number of symbols and diacritics that may be unfamiliar to non-specialists. The advantage of broad transcription is that it usually allows statements to be made which apply across a more diverse language community. It is thus more appropriate for the pronunciation data in foreign language dictionaries, which may discuss phonetic details in the preface but rarely give them for each entry. A rule of thumb in many linguistics contexts is therefore to use a narrow transcription when it is necessary for the point being made, but a broad transcription whenever possible.

Types of notational systems
Most phonetic transcription is based on the assumption that linguistic sounds are segmentable into discrete units that can be represented by symbols. Many different types of transcription, or "notation", have been tried out: these may be divided into Alphabetic (which are based on the same principle as that which governs ordinary alphabetic writing, namely that of using one single simple symbol to represent each sound) and Analphabetic (notations which are not alphabetic) which represent each sound by a composite symbol made up of a number of signs put together.

Alphabetic

The International Phonetic Alphabet (IPA) is the most widely used and well-known of present-day phonetic alphabets and has a long history. It was created in the nineteenth century by European language teachers and linguists. It soon developed beyond its original purpose as a tool of foreign language pedagogy and is now also used extensively as a practical alphabet of phoneticians and linguists. It is found in many dictionaries, where it is used to indicate the pronunciation of words, but most American dictionaries for native English-speakers, e.g., American Heritage Dictionary of the English Language, Random House Dictionary of the English Language, Webster's Third New International Dictionary, avoid phonetic transcription and instead employ respelling systems based on the English alphabet, with diacritical marks over the vowels and stress marks. (See Pronunciation respelling for English for a generic version.)

Another commonly encountered alphabetic tradition was originally created by American linguists for the transcription of Native American and European languages and is still commonly used  by linguists of Slavic, Indic, Semitic, Uralic (here known as the Uralic Phonetic Alphabet) and Caucasian languages. This is often labeled the Americanist phonetic alphabet despite having been widely used for languages outside the Americas. The principal difference between these alphabets and the IPA is that the specially created characters of the IPA are abandoned in favour of already existing typewriter characters with diacritics (e.g. many characters are borrowed from Eastern European orthographies) or digraphs. Examples of this transcription may be seen in Pike's Phonemics and in many of the papers reprinted in Joos's Readings in Linguistics 1. In the days before it was possible to create phonetic fonts for computer printers and computerized typesetting, this system allowed material to be typed on existing typewriters to create printable material.

There are also extended versions of the IPA, for example: Ext-IPA, VoQS, and Luciano Canepari's canIPA.

Aspects of alphabetic transcription
The International Phonetic Association recommends that a phonetic transcription should be enclosed in square brackets "[ ]". A transcription that specifically denotes only phonemic contrasts may be enclosed in slashes "/ /" instead. If one is unsure, it is best to use brackets since by setting off a transcription with slashes, one makes a theoretical claim that every symbol phonemically contrasts for the language being transcribed.

For phonetic transcriptions, there is flexibility in how closely sounds may be transcribed. A transcription that gives only a basic idea of the sounds of a language in the broadest terms is called a broad transcription; in some cases, it may be equivalent to a phonemic transcription (only without any theoretical claims). A close transcription, indicating precise details of the sounds, is called a narrow transcription. They are not binary choices but the ends of a continuum, with many possibilities in between. All are enclosed in brackets.

For example, in some dialects the English word pretzel in a narrow transcription would be , which notes several phonetic features that may not be evident even to a native speaker. A yet broader transcription would be  in which every symbol represents an unambiguous speech sound but without going into any unnecessary detail. None of those transcriptions makes any claims about the phonemic status of the sounds. Instead, they represent certain ways in which it is possible to produce the sounds that make up the word.

There are also several possibilities in how to transcribe the word phonemically, but here, the differences are generally of not precision but analysis. The latter transcription suggests that there are two vowels in the word even if they cannot both be heard, but the former suggests that there is only one.

Strictly speaking, it is not possible to have a distinction between "broad" and "narrow" within phonemic transcription, since the symbols chosen represent only sounds that have been shown to be distinctive. However, the symbols themselves may be more or less explicit about their phonetic realization. A frequently cited example is the symbol chosen for the English consonant at the beginning of the words 'rue', 'rye', 'red': this is frequently transcribed as /r/, despite the symbol suggesting an association with the IPA symbol  which is used for a tongue-tip trill. It is equally possible within a phonemic transcription to use the symbol , which in IPA usage refers to an alveolar approximant; this is the more common realization for English pronunciation in America and England. Phonemic symbols will frequently be chosen to avoid diacritics as much as possible, under a 'one sound one symbol' policy, or may even be restricted to the ASCII symbols of a typical keyboard, as in the SAMPA alphabet.

Occasionally a transcription will be enclosed in pipes ("| |"). This goes beyond phonology into morphological analysis. However, a native English speaker would recognize that underneath this, they represent the same plural ending. This can be indicated with the pipe notation.

To avoid confusion with IPA symbols, it may be desirable to specify when native orthography is being used, so that, for example, the English word jet is not read as "yet". This is done with angle brackets or chevrons: . It is also common to italicize such words, but the chevrons indicate specifically that they are in the original language's orthography, and not in English transliteration.

Iconic

In iconic phonetic notation, the shapes of the phonetic characters are designed so that they visually represent the position of articulators in the vocal tract. This is unlike alphabetic notation, where the correspondence between character shape and articulator position is arbitrary. This notation is potentially more flexible than alphabetic notation in showing more shades of pronunciation (MacMahon 1996:838–841). An example of iconic phonetic notation is the Visible Speech system, created by Scottish phonetician Alexander Melville Bell (Ellis 1869:15).

Analphabetic
Another type of phonetic notation that is more precise than alphabetic notation is analphabetic phonetic notation. Instead of both the alphabetic and iconic notational types' general principle of using one symbol per sound, analphabetic notation uses long sequences of symbols to precisely describe the component features of an articulatory gesture (MacMahon 1996:842–844). This type of notation is reminiscent of the notation used in chemical formulas to denote the composition of chemical compounds. Although more descriptive than alphabetic notation, analphabetic notation is less practical for many purposes (e.g. for descriptive linguists doing fieldwork or for speech pathologists impressionistically transcribing speech disorders). As a result, this type of notation is uncommon.

Two examples of this type were developed by the Danish Otto Jespersen (1889) and American Kenneth Pike (1943). Pike's system, which is part of a larger goal of scientific description of phonetics, is particularly interesting in its challenge against the descriptive method of the phoneticians who created alphabetic systems like the IPA. An example of Pike's system can be demonstrated by the following. A syllabic voiced alveolar nasal consonant ( in IPA) is notated as

 MaIlDeCVoeIpvnnAPpaatdtltnransnsfSpvavdtlvtnransssfTpgagdtlwvtitvransnsfSrpFSs

In Pike's notation there are 5 main components (which are indicated using the example above):

 M – manner of production (i.e., MaIlDe)
 C – manner of controlling (i.e., CVoeIpvnn)
 description of stricture (i.e., APpaatdtltnransnsfSpvavdtlvtnransssfTpgagdtlwvtitvransnsf)
 S – segment type (i.e., Srp)
 F – phonetic function (i.e., FSs)

The components of the notational hierarchy of this consonant are explained below:

See also
English Phonetic Alphabet
 Eye dialect
 Orthographic transcription
 Phonetic spelling
 Phonetics
 Pronunciation respelling for English
 Pronunciation spelling
 Romanization
 Transliteration

Notational systems
 Americanist phonetic notation
ARPABET
 Cyrillic phonetic alphabet
 International Phonetic Alphabet
 Comparison of ASCII encodings of the International Phonetic Alphabet
 SAMPA
 X-SAMPA
 IPA chart for English
 RFE Phonetic Alphabet, (Revista de Filología Española)
 Stokoe notation to represent sign languages
 Uralic Phonetic Alphabet (UPA)
 Visible Speech
 Teuthonista

Bibliography
 Albright, Robert W. (1958). The International Phonetic Alphabet: Its Background and Development. International Journal of American Linguistics (Vol. 24, No. 1, Part 3); Indiana University Research Center in Anthropology, Folklore, and Linguistics, publ. 7. Baltimore. (Doctoral dissertation, Stanford University, 1953).
 Canepari, Luciano. (2005). A Handbook of Phonetics:  Phonetics. München: Lincom Europa, pp. 518.  (hb).
 Ellis, Alexander J. (1869–1889). On Early English Pronunciation (Parts 1 & 5). London: Philological Society by Asher & Co.; London: Trübner & Co.
 International Phonetic Association. (1949). The Principles of the International Phonetic Association, Being a Description of the International Phonetic Alphabet and the Manner of Using It, Illustrated by Texts in 51 Languages. London: University College, Department of Phonetics.
 International Phonetic Association. (1999). Handbook of the International Phonetic Association: A Guide to the Use of the International Phonetic Alphabet. Cambridge: Cambridge University Press.  (hb);  (pb).
 Jespersen, Otto. (1889). The Articulations of Speech Sounds Represented by Means of Analphabetic Symbols. Marburg: Elwert.
 Kelly, John. (1981). The 1847 Alphabet: An Episode of Phonotypy. In R. E. Asher & E. J. A. Henderson (Eds.), Towards a History of Phonetics. Edinburgh: Edinburgh University Press.
 Kemp, J. Alan. (1994). Phonetic Transcription: History. In R. E. Asher & J. M. Y. Simpson (Eds.), The Encyclopedia of Language and Linguistics (Vol. 6, pp. 3040–3051). Oxford: Pergamon.
 MacMahon, Michael K. C. (1996). Phonetic Notation. In P. T. Daniels & W. Bright (Ed.), The World's Writing Systems (pp. 821–846). New York: Oxford University Press. .
 Pike, Kenneth L. (1943). Phonetics: A Critical Analysis of Phonetic Theory and a Technique for the Practical Description of Sounds. Ann Arbor: University of Michigan Press.
 Pullum, Geoffrey K.; & Ladusaw, William A. (1986). Phonetic Symbol Guide. Chicago: University of Chicago Press. .
 Sweet, Henry. (1880–1881). Sound Notation. Transactions of the Philological Society, 177-235.
 Sweet, Henry. (1971). The Indispensable Foundation: A Selection from the Writings of Henry Sweet. Henderson, Eugénie J. A. (Ed.). Language and Language Learning 28. London: Oxford University Press.

References

 

de:Lautschrift